Tip-off may refer to:

Tip-off, jump ball starting a period in basketball
Tip Off, 1991 basketball video game

See also
 The Tip-Off (disambiguation)